Nibbi  is a mountain in the county of Viken, in southern Norway, Europe.

Tourism
Nibbi mountain get good quality of snow and is popular during skiing season.

References

Mountains of Viken